The Norcatur City Hall, located at 107 N. Decatur Ave. in Norcatur, Kansas, was listed on the National Register of Historic Places in 2014.

It was the city hall of Norcatur, which has population 150.

It has also been known as  US Highway 36 Association Museum.

References

External links

Government buildings on the National Register of Historic Places in Kansas
Government buildings completed in 1937
Museums in Decatur County, Kansas
City and town halls in Kansas